Alaeddin Soueidan (born 12 December 1970) is a Syrian diver. He competed in the men's 10 metre platform event at the 1984 Summer Olympics.

References

1970 births
Living people
Syrian male divers
Olympic divers of Syria
Divers at the 1984 Summer Olympics
Place of birth missing (living people)